Lulworthiales is an order of fungi in the class Sordariomycetes and Subclass Lulworthiomycetidae.

See also 
 List of fungal orders

References

External links 
 

 
Ascomycota orders